Solivomer arenidens is a species of blackchin only known from the waters around the Philippines where they are known from around .

References
 

Myctophiformes
Fish of the Pacific Ocean
Fish of the Philippines
Monotypic fish genera
Fish described in 1947